

vf

Vfend (Pfizer)

vi

Vi-Dom-A 
Vi-Twel 
Viadur 
Viagra (Pfizer)
Vibisone 
Vibra-tabs 
Vibramycin (Pfizer)
Vicks Formula 44 
Vicodin (Abbott Laboratories)
Vicoprin 
Vicoprofen 
vicriviroc (USAN)
Victoza (Novo Nordisk)
vidarabine (INN)
Vidaza 
Videx 
vidofludimus (INN)
vidupiprant (INN)
vigabatrin (INN)
Vigamox 
Viibryd (Forest Laboratories)
vilanterol (INN)
vilazodone (USAN)
vildagliptin (USAN)
viloxazine (INN)
viminol (INN)
vinbarbital (INN)
vinblastine (INN)
vinburnine (INN)
vincamine (INN)
vincanol (INN)
vincantril (INN)
Vincasar PFS 
vincofos (INN)
vinconate (INN)
Vincrex 
vincristine (INN)
vindeburnol (INN)
vindesine (INN)
vinepidine (INN)
vinflunine (INN)
vinformide (INN)
vinfosiltine (INN)
vinflunine ditartrate (USAN)
vinglycinate (INN)
vinleucinol (INN)
vinleurosine (INN)
vinmegallate (INN)
vinorelbine (INN)
vinpocetine (INN)
vinpoline (INN)
vinrosidine (INN)
vintiamol (INN)
vintoperol (INN)
vintriptol (INN)
vinylbital (INN)
vinzolidine (INN)
Viocin sulfate 
Viokase
viomycin (INN)
Vioxx (Merck)
vipadenant (USAN, INN)
viprostol (INN)
viqualine (INN)
viquidacin (USAN)
viquidil (INN)
Vira-A 
Virac Rex 
Viracept (ViiV Healthcare)
Viramune 
Virazole 
Viread 
virginiamycin (INN)
viridofulvin (INN)
Virilon 
Viroptic 
viroxime (INN)
Viscoat
Visicol 
visilizumab (INN)
Visine (Johnson & Johnson)
VisionBlue (Dutch Ophthalmic)
Visipaque 
Viskazide 
Visken (Novartis)
vismodegib (USAN, INN)
visnadine (INN)
visnafylline (INN)
Vistacot
Vistaril 
vistatolon (INN)
Vistaril
Vistide 
Visudyne 
Vitaneed
Vitaped 
Vitec
Vitrase 
Vitrasert 
Vitravene 
Vitrax
Vitussin
Vivactil 
Vivelle
Vivitrex (Alkermes/Cephalon Inc.)
Vivitrol (Alkermes/Cephalon Inc.)

vo

voclosporin (USAN)
voglibose (INN)
volasertib (INN, USAN)
volazocine (INN)
volinanserin (USAN)
Volmax 
volociximab (USAN, INN)
Voltaren
Voltarol
vonicog alfa (INN, USAN)
Vontrol 
vorapaxar (USAN, INN)
voreloxin (USAN, INN)
voriconazole (INN)
vorinostat (USAN)
vorozole (INN)
vortioxetine (USAN)
vosaroxin (USAN)
Vosol 
Vospire (DAVA Pharmaceuticals)
votucalis (USAN)
votumumab (INN)
Voveran 
voxergolide (INN)

vu-vy

Vumon (Bristol-Myers Squibb)
Vytone
Vytorin (Merck/Schering-Plough)